This is a list of notable Georgetown University faculty, including both current and past faculty at the Washington, D.C. school. Many former politicians choose to teach at Georgetown, including U.S. Agency for International Development administrator Andrew Natsios, National Security Advisor Anthony Lake, U.S. Senator and Senate Democratic Leader Tom Daschle, Under Secretary of Defense for Policy Douglas Feith, and CIA director George Tenet. Politically, Georgetown's faculty members give more support to liberal candidates, and their donation patterns are consistent with those of other American university faculties. All of Georgetown University's presidents have been faculty as well.

Current faculty

Business
 Jason Brennan
 Michael Czinkota
 Pietra Rivoli

Economics
 George Akerlof
 Ibrahim Oweiss

English
 Aminatta Forna
 Carolyn Forché
 Christopher Shinn
 David Gewanter
 Jennifer Natalya Fink
 Lydia Brown
 Maureen Corrigan

Government
 José María Aznar
 Paul Begala
 E. J. Dionne
 Pablo Eisenberg (1999– )
 Ted Gayer
 Thane Gustafson
 Charles King
 Aleksander Kwaśniewski (2006– )
 Mark Lance
 Robert Lieber (1982– )
 Catherine Lotrionte
 Hans Noel
 Sam Potolicchio
 Yossi Shain (1999–2003)
 Kathleen Kennedy Townsend
 Sanford J. Ungar
 Arturo Valenzuela

History 

 Jordan Sand

International Relations
 Madeleine Albright
 Anthony Clark Arend
 Chester Crocker (1972–1981, 1989– )
 Robert Gallucci (1996–2009)
 Chuck Hagel (2009– )
 H. Allen Holmes
 Seth Jones
 Christopher C. Joyner
 Matthew Kroenig
 Anthony Lake
 Robert Litwak
 Donald McHenry
 Dale D. Murphy
 David Nalle
 Paul R. Pillar
 George Tenet (2004– )
 Álvaro Uribe

Languages
 Charles Lane
 G. Ronald Murphy
 James J. O'Donnell
 Deborah Tannen

Law
 Charles F. Abernathy
 T. Alexander Aleinikoff
 Walter Berns
 Norman Birnbaum
 M. Gregg Bloche
 Rosa Brooks
 David D. Cole
 Viet D. Dinh
 Peter Edelman
 Lawrence O. Gostin
 Pamela Harris
 Judith Richards Hope
 Robert Katzmann
 Richard J. Leon (1997– )
 David J. McCarthy, Jr. (1965– )
 Naomi Mezey
 Jeffrey P. Minear
 Robert Pitofsky
 John Podesta
 Nicholas Quinn Rosenkranz
 Mark Tushnet
 David Vladeck

Medicine
 Ron Waksman

Philosophy
 Alfonso Gomez-Lobo
 Horace Romano Harré
 Jesse Mann
 Hans-Martin Sass
 Nancy Sherman
 Karen Stohr

Science
 Rachel Barr
 Edward M. Barrows
 Daniel Djakiew
 Dietrich Grönemeyer
 Cal Newport
 Karl H. Pribram
 Richard Schlegel

Sociology
 Donna Brazile
 Victor Cha
 Michael Eric Dyson (2007– )
 Colman McCarthy

Theology
 Jacques Berlinerblau
 John Esposito
 Chester Gillis
 John Haught

Previous faculty
 Royden B. Davis (1966–1989)
 Benedict Joseph Flaget (1795–1798)
 Patrick Francis Healy (1866–1882)
 Ambrose Maréchal (c. 1801)

Art
 José Antonio Bowen
 Paul Hume (1950–1977)
 Joel E. Siegel

Business
 Thomas Donaldson (1990–1996)
 George R. Houston, Jr.
 Robert Pozen

Economics
 Selma Mushkin
 Tarik Yousef

Language
 Thomas V. Bermingham (c. 1950s)
 Roland Flint (1968–1997)
 Dmitry Grigorieff (1959–1989)
 Robert Lado (1960–1980)
 Mario Vargas Llosa (1994)
 Scott Pilarz (1996–2003)
 Michael Scott (1975–1989)
 Peter Steinfels (1997–2001)

Law
 Henry Sherman Boutell (1914–1923)
 James R. Browning
 James Harry Covington (1914–1919)
 Samuel Dash (1965–2004)
 John F. Davis (c. 1970s)
 Robert Drinan (1981–2007)
 Martin D. Ginsburg
 Stephen Haseler
 Stephanie Herseth Sandlin
 Neal Katyal
 Steven Marks
 Mari Matsuda (–2008)
 Maeve Kennedy McKean
 Bruce Ohr (1984)
 John G. Roberts (c. 1992)
 Antonin Scalia (c. 1982)
 Joseph E. Schmitz (c. 1990s)
 Carlton R. Sickles (1960–1966)
 John Wolff (1961–2005)

Government
 As'ad AbuKhalil
 Kenneth Baer
 Hanna Batatu (1982–1994)
 William J. Brennan, Jr. (1990–1994)
 Anthony Cordesman
 Tom Daschle (c. 2005)
 Douglas J. Feith (2006–2008)
 Geraldine Ferraro (c. 2000s)
 Anwar Ibrahim (2004–2006)
 Jan Karski (1952–1992)
 Jeane Kirkpatrick (1967–1980, 1985)
 Claes G. Ryn
 James V. Schall (1977–2012)
 Joseph P. Vigorito (1977–1978)

History
 Walter Laqueur (1976–1988)
 Colette Mazzucelli (c. 1996)
 Vladimir Petrov
 Frank M. Snowden, Jr.
 Cyril Toumanoff (1943–1970)
 Allen Weinstein (1981–1984)

International Relations
 James R. Clapper (2006–2007)
 Jules Davids
 Eleanor Lansing Dulles
 John Ikenberry (2001–2004)
 Henry Kissinger (1977–1979)
 Dennis P. Lockhart (2003–2007)
 Louis E. McComas (c. 1890s)
 Andrew Natsios (c. 2005)
 Robert G. Neumann (1976-c. 1990)
 Carroll Quigley
 Florence Roisman
 Dennis Ross (2006–2009)
 Paul A. Russo (1991)
 Sally Shelton-Colby (1991)
 Jean Edward Smith
 Edmund A. Walsh

Medicine
 Malcolm Mencer Martin (1959–2004)

Philosophy
 Edmund Pellegrino (1978–2013)
 Henry Babcock Veatch (1973–1983)

Science
 John Braverman (2003–2006)
 James Curley (1831–1889)
 Edward D. Freis (1957–2005)
 Gregory Jaczko<ref>Meghan Anzelc: Gregory Jaczko, Ph.D. Physics, Commissioner, U.S. Nuclear Regulatory Commission. American Physical Society / www.aps.org</ref>
 Robert S. Ledley
 Paul McNally (1928–1955)
 Charles Wardell Stiles
 William J. Thaler (1960–1976, 1979–2006)

Theology
 Thomas M. King (1968–2009)
 Richard A. McCormick
 Arthur Peacocke (1994)

Fictional
 In Stargate Atlantis, the main character, Dr. Elizabeth Weir, taught a political science course at Georgetown before going to Atlantis.
 Jason Bourne, the main character in the novels of Robert Ludlum and their subsequent film adaptations, is a linguistics professor at Georgetown in The Bourne Legacy, Eric Van Lustbader's 2004 novel continuing Ludlum's series.
 Henry McCord, the husband of United States Secretary of State Elizabeth McCord, is a religion professor at Georgetown on Madam Secretary''.

References

External links
 Full list of Georgetown University faculty experts